Terry Michael Smith (born May 1959) is an American sportsman, known for his playing and coaching career in American football and baseball, and his ownership of professional sports teams.

After starting his playing career as a defensive back for American football franchise New England Patriots, Smith moved abroad to the United Kingdom, where he achieved international success as the player and head coach of the Manchester Spartans. Smith was also head coach of the Great Britain national American football team. He later spent ten years as owner and general manager of professional American football teams, and two years as owner and general manager of English soccer club Chester City from 1999 to 2001, including a spell as manager during part of his ownership.

Collegiate career
Smith attended Cornell University for two years, where he played football at wide receiver and free safety and baseball at shortstop and second base.

He then transferred to Furman University, where he played football, baseball, and ran track, becoming the only Furman athlete for the past 50 years to play and letter in three sports. In football, he started at free safety for two years on two Southern Conference Championship Furman teams, leading all defensive backs with more than 150 tackles in two seasons and being selected to the Academic All-Southern Conference and All-Region teams.
He was chosen as the State of South Carolina College Defensive Player of the Week for his outstanding performance in a game versus VMI in 1980, and he was also chosen as the Player of the Week for his performances in games versus both The University of North Carolina in 1980 and The University of Florida in 1981.  In the three games combined, Smith totaled 59 tackles, 1 tackle for loss, 3 passes defended, 3 fumbles caused, 1 fumble recovered, and 1 pass interception.

In baseball, he started for two seasons in centerfield, hitting .414 in 1982, the 5th highest single season batting average in Furman history, and he was selected first-team All-Southern Conference and MVP. He finished his career with a .363 career batting average, which is still the second-highest career batting average in Furman history, and the highest career Furman average for the past sixty years. He also stole 29 bases out of 31 attempts, giving him the highest career success rate for steals in Furman history for any player who has attempted more than 10 attempts.

In track, he ran the 100 meter, 200 meter, and 400 meter, and he also ran the 4x100, 4x200, and 4x400 relays.  Smith was nominated for the Southern Conference Athlete of the Year.

American football

Professional career
Smith started his professional American football career in 1982. He was signed as a free agent by the New England Patriots. However, he injured his knee in a game against the Philadelphia Eagles, an injury that required major reconstructive surgery, and was placed on the injured reserve list. He stayed with the Patriots for two years before eventually having to retire because his injured knee would not pass the team physical at the time. He returned to the football field signing for the Arizona Wranglers in the USFL in 1984, and in professional baseball was invited to spring training with the Cincinnati Reds and signed with the Miami Marlins.

In 1988, Smith signed to play and coach for the Manchester Spartans American football team overseas in Great Britain British American Football Association. As a wide receiver and free safety from 1988-1998, Smith set playing records with the Spartans, including setting the then British National League record for pass interceptions in a season with 11 (according to http://www.britballnow.co.uk/), and the British record for pass receptions in a single game with 15 pass receptions for 245 yards on July 7, 1991. His career best receiving yards season was 1988 with 1020 yards. He was named to the All-Europe Team on several occasions as both a wide receiver and free safety.

Coaching career
After coaching at U.S. colleges, Smith went to Great Britain after signing with the Manchester Spartans football club in the NFL-sponsored League. Due to his high level of success, which included turning around a 2-10 team before he arrived into an all-time British record 14-0 undefeated team in his first season in 1988, Smith was chosen by the Great Britain National Governing Body as the head coach of the Great Britain national American football team. 
As the Manchester Spartans head coach, he won three straight Division Championships, three straight Conference Championships, two straight British National Championships, one Budweiser Bowl championship in 1989 at Crystal Palace in London, England, one Coca-Cola Bowl championship in 1990 at Crystal Palace in London, England, one Eurobowl championship with the Manchester Spartans in 1990 in Rimini, Italy, and one European Championship in Hamburg, Germany as the National team head coach with the Great Britain National Team in 1989.
As the head coach of the Great Britain national team, Smith and his British national team defeated France 35-6 in the European Quarter-Final in a game played in Birmingham, England, Germany 38-6 in the European Semi-Final in a game played in Hamburg, Germany, and Finland 26-0 in the European Nations Championship Final in Hamburg, Germany. 
After leading the Spartans to the Great Britain national championship in order to qualify for the European Football League European Championship competition, Smith led the Spartans to victories over the Dublin Celts from Ireland in a game played in Dublin, Ireland, the Amsterdam Crusaders from the Netherlands in the European Quarter-Final in a game played in Manchester, England, the Berlin Adler from Germany in the European Semi-Final in a game played in Rimini, Italy, and the Legnano Frogs from Italy in the European Championship Final in Rimini, Italy, to win the 1990 Eurobowl Championship.  Smith and his Spartans also played in the Schweppes Cool Masters European Final in Hamburg, Germany in 1992.

With the Great Britain National Team, Smith led Great Britain to victories over France, Germany, and Finland by a combined score of 99-12 to win the 1989 European Nations Championship.

Prior to Smith becoming head coach, no British team in history, club team or national team, had ever won a single game in European competition.  However, Smith transformed the British game and went a perfect 7 wins and no losses in all European competitions with both of his two teams, the Spartans and the Great Britain national team, winning the first two European Championships in British American football history.
As a result of these successes, Smith was nominated to Queen Elizabeth II for national end-of-year awards.

Smith was the first coach in European history to have won both the Club European Championship and the European Nation’s Championship. He won more than 100 games in total as a head coach, while losing only 15. Due to his coaching success, Smith was selected as the National Coach of the Year three straight times, and as the European Coach of the Year twice. In addition, due to his playing and coaching success, Smith was selected to the Great Britain American Football Hall of Fame in 2004, and to the Minor league football (gridiron) American Football Association (AFA) Hall of Fame in 1995.

Professional sports team ownership
Smith went on to become the owner of several professional sports teams, including the National Champion and European Champion Manchester Spartans. In addition, he became the first American owner, chairman, and chief executive in the history of professional English League (Soccer) and European football. Americans have since gone on to own several of the European professional football (soccer) teams, including English teams Manchester United and Liverpool, but Smith initiated American ownership by becoming the first American to have a vision of the opportunity and to purchase a team. In July 1999, he bought financially struggling English League club Chester City, a club that was financially insolvent and being run by an administrator. He declared his belief that the club could reach Division One (now the EFL Championship) within three years. The club was in administration when he took over, and close to folding with more than £1 million in debt and almost all the veteran players already sold to other clubs in order to pay club bills to keep the club from going out of business. He was credited with rescuing Chester from the brink of bankruptcy by supporters at the time, and announced an intention to appoint three supporters to the club board of directors, which he did.

Manager Kevin Ratcliffe quit the job four games into the season with the team at the bottom of the table, having not scored a goal yet in the league, attempting to claim £350,000 from a previously unknown contract that the administrator had not even known existed, an alleged contract that supposedly allowed him to resign by his own choice and still be paid this amount that was equal to more than five years of his managerial salary as a golden parachute severance payment. This made the financial situation even more difficult. With the club already in large debt and losing hundreds of thousands of pounds every year, and now with an additional large financial severance claim by the ex-manager, then it was not possible to even consider hiring a new manager, and so Smith put together a plan to utilize the assistant coaches that were already in place. Despite by his own admission having little knowledge of association football, Smith appointed himself as the leader of a five-man coaching team, in the role of team manager.

At the time of Smith's takeover, most veteran players had been sold and the remaining players were mostly young. He kept these young players and tried to develop them in order to keep the player wages low, so that the club could not only balance the budget for that season, but also so they could try to pay off the £1 million of debt that Smith inherited. Smith additionally kept costs low during his time as manager by not staying in hotels for away matches, by having the team travel on very basic buses to away matches, and by practicing for free on a piece of unlined grass in the middle of the Chester Racecourse, a horse racetrack in Chester that dates back to the 1500's.

Using this low budget strategy, along with increasing revenue through good Cup runs in the FA Cup and the Worthington Cup, and with increased attendance and commercial advertising, and with Smith serving as both manager and general manager for free at no cost to the club, then Smith was able to get all the club's debts paid off within only five months, which was two and a half years earlier than the administration required.  As a result, the club was out of debt for the first time in at least many decades. 

In Smith's four months and 21 league matches in charge of team affairs, Chester managed wins against Brighton & Hove Albion, Shrewsbury Town and others, but lost 5–1 and 4–1 to Leyton Orient and Carlisle United respectively, and required a replay to overcome non-league minnows Whyteleafe in the FA Cup. However, they did find success in the Worthington Cup, beating First Division Port Vale 6–5 on aggregate; they won 2–1 at the Deva Stadium in a game which saw both Marcus Bent and Martyn Lancaster sent off, and then drew 4–4 in the return leg at Vale Park.

They also had success in the FA Cup, as they made it to the third round for just the third time in the club's 100-year history. Drawn against Manchester City, they only lost in the final minutes after the score was tied at 1–1 with eleven minutes left. While scouting Man City ahead of the match, Smith, who came up with a very good strategy and team plan for the Man City match, found that when he could watch a match from up in the stands, then he was able to see the necessary tactical adjustments because of his many years of experience coaching American football, where coaches scout opponents by spending hundreds of hours every season watching game footage of their opponents that is filmed from high in the stands. This skill would benefit the team considerably the following season, when Smith would scout all of Chester's impending Cup opponents.

Smith remains the only American to ever be the manager of a club in either the Football League or the FA Cup. His methods included saying aloud the Lord's Prayer during his pre-match team talk, preparing lengthy written strategic game plans for each match that he went over in his pre-match team talk and gave copies of to each player, always staying positive no matter the current difficulties and circumstances, developing a school program where he went with players to speak with and coach schoolchildren, and to give out free tickets to each child for the upcoming matches, and appointing captains for the defence, midfield and attack.

In late December 1999, with Chester out of debt and on firm financial footing for the first time in decades thanks to Smith’s tight monetary policies, Smith chose to step down as manager. His decision came only one match after his team had pulled itself off the bottom of the Division following a 2-1 win over Halifax Town. Smith hired veteran manager Ian Atkins to the dual role of director of football and manager in a bid to avoid relegation, while Smith himself took on the role of goalkeeper coach for the remainder of the season.

With the excellent improvements in the club’s financial position, the club was able to sign twelve new players that Atkins wanted and chose, doubling the player wage bill compared with when Smith was manager.  The club was also able to afford to pay for team travel by luxury coaches to away matches instead of the regular buses used during Smith's period, and was able to pay for the team to stay at top hotels with excellent pre-match meals for all away matches instead of traveling to matches by bus on match day as had occurred during Smith's time period.  The club also paid for a proper training facility with two excellent training pitches for Atkins' team, while Smith's team had endured training on a free piece of unlined grass in the middle of a horse racetrack. However, despite these many financial investments in the team, the team began slowly under Atkins, losing seven of his first nine matches in charge, with only one win and one draw, and falling well adrift at the bottom of the Division table. Atkins' team lost his ninth match in charge by a 7-1 score at home to Brighton & Hove Albion, even though Smith's young team had defeated Brighton 3-2 away at Brighton earlier in the season.
Afterwards, however, results began to improve, and a 5-0 home victory over Mansfield Town in April, where Smith signee Angus Eve, Trinidad & Tobago's career leading goal scorer with 43 national team goals, scored two goals, put Chester in a better position.

Going into the final game of the season, Chester had pulled themselves up to 23rd in the 24-team division, and faced a three-way battle with Shrewsbury Town and Carlisle United to avoid the drop to the Conference. With fifteen minutes left in the season, Chester were above both Shrewsbury and Carlisle, but conceded a late goal against Peterborough United that was enough to see them relegated from the Football League on goal difference.

Atkins left, and fan favourite Graham Barrow returned as manager. He completely rebuilt the team, and in the 2000–01 season, his side managed a respectable ninth place, reached the third round of the FA Cup for the second successive season (in a controversial loss to Blackburn Rovers), made it to the semi-finals of the FA Trophy, and won the Conference League Cup, the first silverware for the club in over 70 years. During the season, Smith served as Barrow's scout and set-piece strategist for all Cup opponents, travelling on his own to scout opponents at least once or twice before Chester played them. In this scouting role, Smith utilized his American football background, where every American Football play is planned and choreographed from a set position in intricate detail, to focus on the development of creative set pieces, both corners and free kicks, for all the Cup matches that were based upon the weaknesses he perceived in the opponents' defensive alignment.

In addition, Barrow approached Smith at the start of the season, and asked him to watch the first half of every Chester match from up in the stands as a scout would, and then report what he saw to Barrow at halftime while Barrow was walking from the pitch to the dressing room.  This good working relationship between them continued throughout the season.

In spite of this success, ahead of the 2001–02 season, Smith appointed Gordon Hill, an ex-Manchester United and ex-England player who was a personal friend, to become the new manager. Chester made a dreadful start to the season under Hill, winning only one of their first twelve matches. Smith finally sold his interest in the club to Stephen Vaughan and left at the start of October 2001, with the club completely out of debt other than what it owed him.

In 2003, a British court ordered Chester City to repay £300,000 in unpaid loans to Smith and his family. However, Smith still wanted to help the club, and so he accepted a settlement of far less than half that amount.

In 2004, Chester City FC finished first in their division, and was promoted again into the English League Third Division, thereby at that time fully completing the financial and on-field renovation of the club that had begun when Smith first purchased the club in an effort to rescue it from being closed down in 1999.

AppleMagazine.com wrote in its April 23, 2021 edition that Ted Lasso "was actually inspired by the story of Terry Smith, an American gridiron football coach who took over the English association football team Chester City F.C. and subsequently installed himself as the first-team coach".

The writers and actors of the Ted Lasso series often spoke about Terry Smith before the series began. In this interview and AppleTV+ video, Brendan Hunt, the outstanding co-creator of Ted Lasso, and actor who portrays assistant manager Coach Beard in the Ted Lasso series, discusses a 1999 FourFourTwo soccer magazine article about Terry Smith selling the American dream in a positive way, including a photo in the article of Smith wrapped in an American flag.  This 22 year-old magazine article was published in England in September, 1999, when Smith was being the first American to ever manage and coach a professional English soccer team.

Personal life
Two of Smith's children also graduated from Furman University and played sports there.  
His daughter Shannon, like her father, is a Furman University alum who graduated in 2018, specialising in track and field where she earned All-Southern Conference recognition.
His son Wade graduated in 2019, specialising in American football where he earned Furman’s Academic Achievement Award for having the highest Grade Point Average of every Furman athlete in any sport with a 3.86 GPA in mathematics-economics, and where he was also chosen as the recipient of the C. Dan Joyner Leadership Award that is awarded to the student-athlete in any Furman sport who exemplifies the very highest qualities of leadership, inspiration, and service.

References

1959 births
Living people
Furman University alumni
Furman Paladins football players
Furman Paladins baseball players
New England Patriots players
Coaches of American football from North Carolina
American soccer coaches
Chester City F.C. managers
American expatriate players of American football